Blair Creek is a stream in eastern Shannon County in the Ozarks of southern Missouri. It is a tributary of the Current River.

Blair Creek has the name of the local Blair family.

See also
List of rivers of Missouri

References

Rivers of Shannon County, Missouri
Rivers of Missouri